Laia Codina Panedas (born 22 January 2000) is a Spanish professional footballer who plays as a centre-back for Liga F club FC Barcelona and the Spain women's national team. She has represented Spain in multiple youth national teams.

Early life and education 
Born in Campllong, Province of Girona, Catalonia, Codina began playing football when she was four years old. As a child, she was a player in the lower categories of the Unió Deportiva Cassà, a team from the Girona municipality of Cassá de la Selva. Until the age of 14 she played on boys' teams. In 2014, she signed for Barça.

Codina studies journalism at the Universidad de Vic.

Club career

Barcelona
In 2014, Codina signed for Barcelona to play in the lower categories. In 2017, at the age of 16, she made the leap to Barcelona B. Codina was one of the leaders of the reserve team, becoming the captain the same season they were promoted to the Segunda División Pro.

In the summer of 2019, the club announced that Codina would be in the first-team dynamics, although would be kept mainly as a reserve team player until the end of the season. In June 2020, her contract was extended until 2022, in addition to her definitive jump to the first team the following season.

On 13 October 2019, she made her league debut in a match against Sporting de Huelva. Just four days later, she made her UEFA Women's Champions League debut in a round of 16 match against Minsk.

In her first season as a first-team player, Codina wore the number 3, which she had already worn in the subsidiary. In November 2020, she underwent surgery after suffering an injury to the patellar cartilage in her right knee during a match of the Spanish U-20 team. In March 2021, she began playing again after four months out from injury recovery.

Loan to Milan
On 29 July 2021, Codina signed a one year loan deal with Italian club A.C. Milan.

International career 
Codina has been a regular on Spain's youth national teams, including the under-17, under-19, and under-20 squads. In the summer of 2018, she was selected by Jorge Vilda to compete at the 2018 UEFA Women's Under-19 Championship. Codina was proclaimed a European Under-19 champion with the Spanish team after defeating the German team in the final.

In July 2019, Codina was selected by Pedro López to represent Spain at the 2019 UEFA Women's Under-19 Championship in Scotland. The team was eliminated in the semifinals by France.

Career statistics

Club

International goals

Honours

Club 
FC Barcelona
Primera División: Winner, 2019–20, 2020–21
UEFA Women's Champions League: Winner, 2020–21
Copa de la Reina: 2021
Supercopa de España: 2020

International 
Spain U19
UEFA Women's Under-19 Championship: 2018

References

External links 

 Laia Codina at UEFA 
 Laia Codina at FC Barcelona  
 Laia Codina at La Liga 
 Laia Codina at BDFutbol
 
 
 
 

2000 births
FC Barcelona Femení players
Spanish women's footballers
Living people
Primera División (women) players
Women's association football central defenders
Footballers from Catalonia
Sportswomen from Catalonia
Segunda Federación (women) players
People from Gironès
Sportspeople from the Province of Girona
FC Barcelona Femení B players
Spanish expatriate sportspeople in Italy
Serie A (women's football) players
Expatriate women's footballers in Italy
A.C. Milan Women players
Spanish expatriate women's footballers
Spain women's youth international footballers
21st-century Spanish women